Padaung ("copper neck") may refer to:
 A tribe of Burma's Kayan ethnic group, known for wearing copper neck rings.
 Padaung language, spoken by the Kayan people of Burma
 Padaung (village)
 Padung (earring) a type of earring worn by the Karo people of northern Sumatras